French dressing is a term originally used for an oil and vinegar based salad dressing.

French dressing may also refer to:

 French Dressing (1927 film)
 French Dressing (1964 film)

See also
 Vinaigrette, culinary sauce known as "French dressing" in the 19th century